In pair production, a photon creates an electron positron pair. In the process of photons scattering in air (e.g. in lightning discharges), the most important interaction is the scattering of photons at the nuclei of atoms or molecules. The full quantum mechanical process of pair production can be described by the quadruply differential cross section given here:

with

This expression can be derived by using a quantum mechanical symmetry between pair production and Bremsstrahlung.  is the atomic number,  the fine structure constant,  the reduced Planck's constant and  the speed of light. The kinetic energies  of the positron and electron relate to their total energies  and momenta  via

Conservation of energy yields

The momentum  of the virtual photon between incident photon and nucleus is:

where the directions are given via:

where  is the momentum of the incident photon.

The double differential cross section is:

with

and

This cross section can be applied in Monte Carlo simulations. An analysis of this expression shows that positrons are mainly emitted in the direction of the incident photon.

References

Quantum mechanics
Particle physics